The Perseids are a prolific meteor shower associated with the comet Swift–Tuttle. The meteors are called the Perseids because the point from which they appear to hail (called the radiant) lies in the constellation Perseus.

Etymology
The name is derived from the word Perseidai, the sons of Perseus in Greek mythology.

Characteristics

The stream of debris is called the Perseid cloud and stretches along the orbit of the comet Swift–Tuttle. The cloud consists of particles ejected by the comet as it travels on its 133-year orbit. Most of the particles have been part of the cloud for around a thousand years. However, there is also a relatively young filament of dust in the stream that was pulled off the comet in 1865, which can give an early mini-peak the day before the maximum shower. The dimensions of the cloud in the vicinity of the Earth are estimated to be approximately 0.1 astronomical units (AU) across and 0.8 AU along the Earth's orbit, spread out by annual interactions with the Earth's gravity.

The shower is visible from mid-July each year, with the peak in activity between 9 and 14 August, depending on the particular location of the stream. During the peak, the rate of meteors reaches 60 or more per hour. They can be seen all across the sky; however, because of the shower's radiant in the constellation of Perseus, the Perseids are primarily visible in the Northern Hemisphere. As with many meteor showers the visible rate is greatest in the pre-dawn hours, since more meteoroids are scooped up by the side of the Earth moving forward into the stream, corresponding to local times between midnight and noon, as can be seen in the accompanying diagram. While many meteors arrive between dawn and noon, they are usually not visible due to daylight. Some can also be seen before midnight, often grazing the Earth's atmosphere to produce long bright trails and sometimes fireballs. Most Perseids burn up in the atmosphere while at heights above .

Peak times

Historical observations and associations

Some Catholics refer to the Perseids as the "tears of Saint Lawrence", suspended in the sky but returning to Earth once a year on August 10, the canonical date of that saint's martyrdom in 258 AD. The saint is said to have been burned alive on a gridiron. His manner of death is almost certainly the origin of the Mediterranean folk legend which says that the shooting stars are the sparks of Saint Lawrence's martyrdom. The folk legend also says that during the night of August 9–10 cooled embers appear in the ground under plants, and which are known as the "coal of Saint Lawrence".

The transition in favor of the Catholic saint and his feast day on August 10 and away from pagan gods and their festivals, known as Christianization, was facilitated by the phonetic assonance of the Latin name Laurentius with Larentia.

In 1836 Adolphe Quetelet wrote, "J'ai cru remarquer aussi une fréquence plus grande de ces météores au mois d'août (du 8 au 15)." - "I think I noticed also a greater frequency of these meteors in the month of August (from 8 to 15 )." After studying historical records, he predicted a peak on 10 August. He then wrote to other astronomers who confirmed this prediction on the night of 10 August 1837. Quetelet missed the shower due to bad weather.

In 1866, after the perihelion passage of Swift-Tuttle in 1862, the Italian astronomer Giovanni Virginio Schiaparelli discovered the link between meteor showers and comets. The finding is contained in an exchange of letters with Angelo Secchi.

In popular culture
In his 1972 song "Rocky Mountain High", American singer-songwriter John Denver refers to his experience watching the Perseid meteor shower during a family camping trip in the mountains near Aspen, Colorado, with the chorus lyric, "I've seen it raining fire in the sky."

In the 1998 song "Hoshi no Furu Oka" (Starry Hill) from her debut album, Misia sings about finding herself alone atop a starry hill and reminiscing on watching the Perseid meteor showers the previous year in the company of her lover.

In his 2006 novel Against the Day, American novelist Thomas Pynchon refers to the Perseid meteor showers being watched by three characters west of the Dolores Valley after playing a game of tarot.

In the popular Japanese band Sandaime J Soul Brothers's 2013 song "R.Y.U.S.E.I" (Meteor), they describe the Perseid meteor as falling like an evening rain shower – its shooting stars like raindrops pulling their tails behind them.

In the 2014 song “RPG,” by Japanese band Sekai no Owari, the narrator mentions watching the Perseid meteor shower on the night something “precious to them fell apart.”

The 2014 pop song "Meteorites" by Canadian musician LIGHTS uses Perseids as a metaphor for escaping financial hardship.

In the popular TV Series Curious George, season 7 episode 1b, George and his friends Allie and Bill hunt for the Perseids, which they believe are creatures that look like purses. At the end of the episode, Allie's grandfather Mr. Renkins says that the Perseids is a meteor shower happening in early August.

Also referenced, in Netflix Original series Puffin Rock.

See also
Leonids, associated with the comet Tempel–Tuttle
Asteroid impact prediction
Earth-grazing fireball
List of asteroid close approaches to Earth
Meteoroid

References

General and cited references 
 Littman, Mark, The Heavens on Fire: The Great Leonid Meteor Storms, Cambridge, Cambridge University Press, 1998. . Chapter 6, "The Discovery of the August Meteors", pp. 83–100.

External links

 Where to see the Perseids and public stargazing events in the UK (Go Stargazing)
 Worldwide viewing times for the 2016 Perseids meteor shower
 All you need to know about the Perseid meteor shower (Paul Sutherland)
 How to photograph the Perseid meteor shower (Skymania)
 Perseid Observing Conditions (The International Project for Radio Meteor Observation)
 2014 Perseids Radio results (RMOB)
 Perseid Visibility Map (2014 NASA Meteoroid Environment Office)
 2009 Perseid Meteor Fireball
 NASA website on the Perseid shower of 2009
 Sky & Telescope Magazine – Perseids at Their Prime
 2012 Image of Perseids emanating from the radiant
 What are the perseids?

July events
August events
Meteor showers
Perseus (constellation)